Finspång is a locality and the seat of Finspång Municipality, Östergötland County, Sweden with 12,440 inhabitants in 2010.

Overview

Finspång is a traditional industrial town. The first industries were established in 1580 when a Royal factory for cannon and cannon balls was chartered. The industry was to continue for 300 years under supervision of the Walloon/Dutch family De Geer. Anders Qvarfordt was employed by Count Louis de Geer. His assignment was "to lodge and feed the Count de Geers Vallon blacksmiths".  Finspång Castle was built by Louis De Geer (1622–1695), and around it industries and an orangery developed into the town of Finspång.

In the late 19th century Bofors steel works, which initially supplied forgings and castings to the factory, started to expand into the weapons business. With Alfred Nobel's help, by the 1911 AB Bofors-Gullspång had outcompeted, bought and closed down its competitor.

When in 1913 a turbine plant STAL was founded in the town, both good metalwork facilities and skilled labor were available. In 1916 the company became a subsidiary of ASEA.

Today the two main industrial areas are those of Siemens Energy turbines and metal processing.

Administratively Finspång remained part of the rural municipality Risinge until 1942, when it was made a market town (köping). Since 1971 it is the seat of the enlarged Finspång Municipality.

Notable people
Dan Swanö
Tony Särkkä
Pär Arvidsson
Bengt Baron
Liselotte Neumann, golfer. Winner of 25 professional golf tournaments
Bertil Andersson, academic leader
Charles De Geer born 1720, noted naturalist

Sports
The following sports clubs are located in Finspång Municipality:

 Sonstorps IK
Finspångs FK
Finspångs SOK

Twinnings
 Joutsa, Finland

References

External links 

 Finspångs kommun - Official site

Populated places in Östergötland County
Populated places in Finspång Municipality
Municipal seats of Östergötland County
Swedish municipal seats